Sorgaz is a town and Union Council of Mastung District in the Balochistan province of Pakistan. The town is located at 27°43'60N 66°41'50E with an altitude of 1148 metres (3769 feet).

References

Populated places in Mastung District